Pune Marathas is a tennis team representing the city of Pune, India, in Champions Tennis League. The franchise is owned by Mysport, which has been promoted by Rendezvous Group.

The players representing this team are Pat Cash, Marcos Baghdatis, Agnieszka Radwańska, Saketh Myneni, Shweta Rana and S D Prajwal Dev. Bollywood actor Shreyas Talpade is the team's brand ambassador.

References
 

Tennis teams in India
Sports teams in Maharashtra
Sport in Pune
2014 establishments in Maharashtra
Sports clubs established in 2014